Jürgen Melzer and Philipp Petzschner were the defending champions, but chose not to participate this year. 
Łukasz Kubot and Marcelo Melo won the title, defeating Jamie Murray and John Peers in the final, 4–6, 7–6(7–3), [10–6].

Seeds

Draw

Draw

Qualifying

Seeds

Qualifiers
  Rajeev Ram /  Radek Štěpánek

Qualifying draw

External links
 Main draw
 Qualifying draw

Erste Bank Open - Doubles
2015 Doubles
Erste Bank Open Doubles